The Polish Pairs Speedway Junior Championship is an annual speedway event held each year in different Polish clubs organized by the Polish Motor Union since 1983.

First edition was in 1980, but it was a Junior U-23 event.

The participating teams are drawn into three groups; each staging a pairs competition. The top two teams in each group qualify for the Final. A host team chosen by the GKSŻ is seeded directly to the Final.

The team winning the Final is awarded a gold medal and declared Polish Pairs Champions. Teams finishing second and third are awarded silver and bronze medals respectively.

Previous winners

See also

Pairs 21
Speedway Junior